Sadlinki  is a village in Kwidzyn County, Pomeranian Voivodeship, in northern Poland. It is the seat of the gmina (administrative district) called Gmina Sadlinki.

The village has a population of 2,158.

References

Sadlinki